Henry Willoughby, 8th Baron Middleton (28 August 1817 Nottingham – 20 December 1877 Birdsall House, Birdsall), was an English peer.

He was born at Apsley Hall, Nottingham, the eldest son of Henry Willoughby (15 December 1780 – 1849) and Charlotte Eyre (died 1845) and educated at Eton and Trinity College, Cambridge. He succeeded to the title of Baron Middleton in 1856, on the passing of his cousin, the 7th Baron Middleton, who died without legitimate issue. He lived in the Willoughby family seat at Birdsall House, which he preferred to Wollaton Park, Nottinghamshire, the family seat he inherited from his cousin.

He was appointed Honorary Colonel of the 1st Administrative Brigade of Yorkshire (East Riding) Artillery Volunteers on 17 December 1862, and his son the Hon. Digby Willoughby, (later 9th Baron), a former captain in the Scots Fusilier Guards, was appointed second major in the brigade on 30 July 1869. The 9th Baron later commanded the unit as Lt-Col, became Hon Col in turn on 29 May 1879, and held the post into the 20th Century.

Family

He married The Hon. Julia Louisa Bosville (5 April 1824 York–11 October 1901 Settrington), granddaughter of the 3rd Baron Macdonald of Slate and descendant of Prince William Henry, Duke of Gloucester and Edinburgh, on 3 August 1843 in London and had 13 children:
 Digby Wentworth Bayard Willoughby, 9th Baron Middleton (1844–1922)
 Hon. Alexandrina Henrietta Matilda Willoughby (c. 1845 – 11 December 1931), married on 3 February 1869 Sir John Thorold 12th Thorold Baronet
 Godfrey Ernest Percival Willoughby, 10th Baron Middleton (1847–1924)
 Hon. Francis Henry Stirling Willoughby (13 August 1848 – 23 June 1900)
 Hon. Rothwell James Bosville Willoughby (26 May 1850 – 1867)
 Hon. Leopold Vincent Harold Willoughby (19 November 1851 – 22 March 1924)
 Hon. Hylda Maria Madeline Willoughby (c.1853 – 9 February 1944), married on 20 April 1882 William Henry Garforth (d. 1931) in 1882
 Hon. Lettice Hermione Violet Willoughby (c. 1854 – 9 August 1922), married on 18 April 1895 Col. William Gordon-Cumming (d. 1908)
 Hon. Leila Louisa Millicent Willoughby (c. 1856 – 24 February 1886), married on 10 February 1876 Rev. Henry Charles Russell (d. 1922)
 Hon. Mairi Myrtle Willoughby (c. 1858 – 13 November 1900), married on 1 January 1880 William Bethell (d. 1926)
 Hon. Tatton Lane Fox Willoughby (29 December 1860 – 10 July 1947), married on 18 June 1898 Esther Ann Strickland (d. 1940), daughter of Sir Charles Strickland, 8th Baronet
 Col. Hon. Claude Henry Comaraich Willoughby (1862–1932), married in 1904 Sibyl Louise Murray (d. 1957)
 Hon. Alexander Hugh Willoughby (18 September 1863 – 5 December 1927), married in 1889 Mary Selina Honoria Macdonald (d. 1925)

References

1817 births
1877 deaths
People educated at Eton College
Royal Artillery officers
Henry 8
Volunteer Force officers